Elliot Bruce Koffman (born 7 May 1942 in Boston, Massachusetts) is a noted computer scientist and educationist. He is the author of numerous widely used introductory textbooks for more than 10 different programming languages, including Ada, BASIC, C, C++, FORTRAN, Java, Modula-2, and Pascal. Since 1974, he has been a professor of computer and information sciences at Temple University, Philadelphia, Pennsylvania.

Education and career
Koffman attended the Massachusetts Institute of Technology, where he earned his Bachelor of Engineering and Master of Engineering degrees in 1964. He received his PhD in 1967 at Case Institute of Technology with a dissertation on learning games through pattern recognition.

That same year, Koffman began work at the National Security Agency in Fort Meade, Maryland as an electrical engineer. He was promoted to captain of the U.S. Army and assigned to the Defense Intelligence Agency in Washington, D.C. from 1967 to 1969.

Koffman also began his teaching career in 1967, serving as a professorial lecturer at George Washington University, Washington, D.C. (1967–1969); an Assistant Professor (1969–1972) and Associate Professor (1972–1974) in the Department of Electrical Engineering and Computer Science at the University of Connecticut; and an Associate Professor (1974–1978) and Full Professor (1978–present) in the Department of Computer and Information Sciences at Temple University.

Koffman's early research was in artificial intelligence and intelligent tutoring systems. In 1974 he began writing and co-authoring textbooks for introductory programming courses for computer science majors (CS1) in programming languages such as Ada, BASIC, C, C++, Fortran, Java, Modula-2, and Pascal. He also wrote textbooks for the first data structures course (CS2) in C++, Java, and Pascal.

In 2009 he was awarded the SIGCSE Outstanding Contribution Award "for an extraordinary record of teaching, curriculum development, publishing papers as well as numerous textbooks, and for helping to shape Computer Science education".

Other activities
Koffman chaired the Association for Computing Machinery (ACM) task force to revise CS1 and CS2 courses from 1983 to 1985. He was also chairman of the ACM Special Interest Group in Computer Science Education (SIGCSE) from 1987 to 1991.

Family
Koffman married Caryn Jackson in 1963. She is a photographer whose work has won awards and has been featured in a local gallery. They have three children, Richard, Deborah and Robin. They live in Elkins Park, Pennsylvania.

Bibliography

 (with Frank L. Friedman)

 (with Frank L. Friedman)
 (with Frank L. Friedman)

 (with Frank L. Friedman)

 (with Bruce R. Maxim)

 (with Richard C. Holt and Chrysanne DiMarco)
 (with Frank L. Friedman)

 "Ada: Problem Solving and Program Design." Feldman, Michael B. & Koffman, Elliot B., . Addison-Wesley Publishing Company; 1992 & 1993. 795 pages.
 (with Michael B. Feldman)
 (with Frank L. Friedman)
 (with Ursula Wolz)
 (with Jeri R. Hanly)
 (with Paul A. T. Wolfgang)
 (with Jeri R. Hanly)
 (with Frank L. Friedman) 
 (with Paul A. T. Wolfgang)

References

External links
 Koffman's page at Temple University
ACM Digital Library: Elliot Bruce Koffman

20th-century American mathematicians
21st-century American mathematicians
American computer scientists
American technology writers
American computer programmers
United States Army officers
Writers from Boston
Writers from Philadelphia
Temple University faculty
1942 births
Living people